Wesley Methodist Church may refer to:

in Canada
Wesley Methodist Church, merged with others to form Wesley Mimico United Church, Toronto

in Singapore
Wesley Methodist Church, Singapore

in the United States

Wesley Methodist Church (Anchorage, Kentucky), listed on the National Register of Historic Places (NRHP)
Wesley Methodist Church (Salem, Massachusetts), NRHP-listed
Wesley Methodist Church, of the Wesley Methodist Church Historic District, Greenwood, Mississippi, NRHP-listed in Leflore County
Wesley Methodist Church (Columbia, South Carolina), NRHP-listed

See also
Wesley Church (disambiguation)
List of Methodist churches, including numerous close variations in name of church